Acleris okanagana is a species of moth of the family Tortricidae. It is found in North America, where it has been recorded from British Columbia and Quebec.

The wingspan is about 17 mm. The forewings are smoky grey with an admixture of rusty scaling. The hindwings are dirty white with faint smoky reticulation in the apical and terminal areas. Adults have been recorded on wing in June.

References

Moths described in 1940
okanagana
Moths of North America